The 1997–98 Euro Hockey Tour was the second season of the Euro Hockey Tour. The season consisted of four tournaments, the Pragobanka Cup, Karjala Tournament, Baltica Brewery Cup, and the Sweden Hockey Games. The games Canada participated in did not count towards the final standings of the tournament.

Tournaments

Pragobanka Cup

Karjala Tournament

Baltica Brewery Cup

3rd place  -  1-2
Final  -  1-0

Sweden Hockey Games

Final standings

References
Euro Hockey Tour website

Euro Hockey Tour
1997–98 in European ice hockey
1997–98 in Canadian ice hockey
1997–98 in Russian ice hockey
1997–98 in Czech ice hockey
1997–98 in Swedish ice hockey
1997–98 in Finnish ice hockey